The Teatro alle Zattere on the Zattere promenade of Ognissanti district was a minor Venetian theatrical opera venue during the 1690s.

It saw the premiere of Pistocchino's first opera Il Leandro, dramma per musica su libretto di Camillo Badovero on 5 May 1679.

References

See also
 Opera houses and theatres in Venice

Zattere
Zattere